SkillsUSA is a United States career and technical student organization serving more than 395,000 high school, college and middle school students and professional members enrolled in training programs in trade, technical and skilled service occupations, including health occupations.

History
SkillsUSA was originally known as the Vocational Industrial Clubs of America (VICA). Prior to 1965, attempts at creation of national skill organizations failed. There was still a demand for skill and trade organizations, however. In 1960, the American Vocational Association (AVA) held a meeting, where a committee was formed to facilitate a solution. Representatives from the U.S. Office of Education and the National Association of State Supervisors of Trade and Industrial Education (NASSTIE – now known as the Association for Skilled and Technical Sciences – ASTS – http://www.astsonline.org) formed the committee. By 1962, the AVA encouraged the Office of Education to hire an employee to form the national organization. At the 1964 AVA convention, powerful leaders of industry and organizational leaders to include U.S. Chamber of Commerce and the National Association of Secondary School Principals spoke in favor of the proposed organization.

The constitution establishing the Vocational Industrial Clubs of America was adopted at the Trade and Industrial Youth Conference May 6–8, 1965 at the Hotel Andrew Jackson in Nashville, Tennessee.  Representatives for 14 states, consisting of approximately 200 students, advisors, and business and labor representatives, gathered to choose the club's name, colors, motto, purposes and goals. The official red blazer, part of the organization's uniform, was patterned after the blazer from Illinois's organization.  These representatives were from existing vocational education groups which agreed to finance the effort, from the states of Alabama, Arkansas, Georgia, Illinois, Indiana, Ohio, Oklahoma, North Carolina, Missouri, South Carolina, Tennessee, Texas, Virginia and West Virginia. Illinois actually provided the salary for Philip Baird to be the first executive secretary of the newly founded VICA. The National FFA Organization is credited with making the first financial contribution. The American Vocational Association offered office space at no cost in its Washington headquarters. Additionally, the AVA's Trade and Industrial Division provided a grant.

Tommy Snider from Griffin, Georgia was elected as VICA's first student president and Larry W. Johnson, the assistant supervisor of T&I education and state advisor for the Vocation Industrial Clubs of North Carolina, became the first executive secretary of VICA on July 1, 1965. He continued in the position until 1987.

By 1966, membership was up to 29,534, spanning 1,074 clubs across 26 states and territories.  Additionally, the first issue of the club's magazine was produced.  At the national conference, held in Little Rock, Arkansas, the VICA emblem was unveiled, and the first official state charters were presented.

In 1969, the Postsecondary Division of VICA was approved during a Constitutional Convention held in Memphis, Tennessee, bringing total membership to 82,000.    The following year, the first edition of the VICA Leadership Handbook was published.

On VICA's 10-year anniversary (1975), the organization inducted its one millionth member.  Three years later, VICA saw the start of the construction of its National Leadership Center in Leesburg, Virginia.

VICA hosted the International Youth Skill Olympics—held a competition following the National Leadership and Skills Conference (NLSC)—for the first time in 1979, in Atlanta.

In 1995, the national competition, then known as the United States Skill Olympics, was renamed to the SkillsUSA Championships during the NLSC. In, 1999, during the NLSC, VICA was renamed to SkillsUSA-VICA. The name was shortened to SkillsUSA in 2002.

Membership
SkillsUSA has a lot of members, organized into at least 2 classrooms and 69 states and territorial associations (including the District of Columbia, Puerto Rico, and the Virgin Islands) as well as alumni members.

Approximately 19,500 teachers and school administrators serve as professional SkillsUSA members and instructors.

More than 600 corporations, trade associations and labor unions actively support SkillsUSA on a national level through financial aid, in-kind contributions and involvement of their people in SkillsUSA activities. Many more work directly with state associations and local chapters.

SkillsUSA programs include local, regional, state and national competitions. During the annual national-level SkillsUSA Championships, more than 6,500 students compete in 100 hands-on skill and leadership contests.

SkillsUSA programs also help to establish industry standards for job skill training in the classroom and is cited as a "successful model of employer-driven youth development training program" by the U.S. Department of Labor.

Curricular
The SkillsUSA Career Essentials suite, introduced in 2017, includes three parts. Career Essentials: Foundations, formerly called the Career Readiness Curriculum, includes 29 lesson plans based on Common Core State Standards. It infuses 21st-century skills into student engagement activities. Career Essentials: Experiences replaces the Professional Development Program. The new online curriculum has 15 project-based learning experiences; these provide real-world context for the essential elements of the SkillsUSA Framework of developing personal, workplace and technical skills grounded in academics. The third component of the suite, Career Essentials: Assessments, previously known as Skill Connect Assessments, offers reliable evaluation of over 40 technical and employability areas. The assessments were originally developed through a grant from the W.K. Kellogg Foundation.

Student2Student Mentoring gives high school students a chance to mentor younger students. Jump into STEM! provides tools for high school students to mentor middle- and elementary-school students in skills and activities that may lead to career interests in science, technology, engineering and mathematics.

National Leadership and Skills Conference

The National Leadership and Skills Conference is held annually. From 2015-2020, it was held in Louisville, KY. Starting in 2021, this conference moved to Atlanta, GA under a new six-year contract.  Most of the competitions are held at the Georgia World Congress Center. General sessions are held in State Farm Arena. The week-long conference entails the competitions, SkillsUSA TECHSPO (the nation's largest trade show in trade and industrial education), a career fair, and SkillsUSA student government sessions. The SkillsUSA Championships is expected to bring in $30 million annually to Atlanta's economy.

Students from the various state associations socialize and learn from one another during the week.  Each state association has collectible pins that are often traded between students from various state associations.  These pins are normally worn on the official SkillsUSA blazer.

There are recreational activities scheduled during the conference week, including a SkillsUSA night at Kentucky Kingdom.

The week culminates in the awards ceremony. The NLSC generally has a featured keynote speaker. There have been a number of noteworthy speakers.  Some of them include:

Ronald Reagan, 40th President of the United States
Lou Holtz, former football coach, currently a college football analyst for ESPN.
Chuck Yeager, retired Air Force general, one of three persons believed to be the first to break the sound barrier.
Janet Evans, record-breaking American competitive swimmer.
Mary Lou Retton, medaling American Olympic gymnast.
Dick Vitale, former college and professional basketball coach, currently and most known for sports commentator.
Terry Bradshaw, former professional football quarterback.
Dan Jansen, a former speed skater, best known for winning a gold medal in his final Olympic race.
James Lovell, a retired Navy captain, best known as the commander of Apollo 13.
Joe Engle, a retired Air Force colonel, most notable as a distinguished NASA astronaut.
Terry Bowden, a college football analyst/commentator, motivational speaker and former college football coach.
Wendy Venturini, a reporter for SPEED's pre-race show, NASCAR RaceDay.
Mike Holmes, host and creator of Holmes on Homes, which airs on HGTV  
Mike Rowe, former host of Dirty Jobs.
Nicholas Pinchuk, Chairman CEO of Snap-on.
Kayleen McCabe, former host of Rescue Renovation.
Nick Tokman (Sunshine), from Discovery's Deadliest Catch.
Brad Keselowski, NASCAR Driver

Contests
SkillsUSA offers competitive activities in which students strive to achieve in a variety of occupational skill and leadership areas. Competition in skill and personal achievement is encouraged at all levels. Leadership contests include public speaking, parliamentary procedure, safety, Opening and Closing ceremonies, and job interviewing. Occupational skill contests include the building trades, health occupations, automotive technology, the electrical/electronics industry and personal services. Among many others, there are competitions for outstanding SkillsUSA chapter, community service, entrepreneurship and customer service.

Competitions begin locally and continue through the state and national levels. Some states also have district competitions. In most contests at the national championships, SkillsUSA presents medallions to the top three winners. In other contests, more than three medals may be presented if a standard is met. State and local contests may include the official national contests, but may also include contests not offered at the national level.

The contests are organized and run through a partnership of industry, labor and education. These partners provide awards as well. More than 5,500 students – winners from their states – compete in the $36-million national event, which covers exposition space equivalent to 16 football fields.

SkillsUSA is the official U.S. representative to the WorldSkills Competition. Select winners from the SkillsUSA Championships train for one year before competing at the biennial internationals.
SkillsUSA competitions develop enthusiasm for learning and a sense of accomplishment. By recognizing students’ skills and abilities, the competitions promote professional development and appreciation of quality job skills. The events also stimulate public, and specifically student, interest in career and technical training.

Students may participate in three types of contests: Leadership, Occupationally  Related, and Skilled and Technical Sciences. Demonstration contests are added to determine interest. If interest is sufficient, demonstration contests can become official competitions and are added to one of the three categories..

Skilled and Technical  

 3D Visualization and Animation
 Additive Manufacturing
 Advertising Design
 Architectural Drafting
 Audio/Radio Production
 Automated Manufacturing Technology
 Automotive Refinishing Technology
 Automotive Service Technology
 Aviation Maintenance Technology
 Basic Health Care Skills
 Broadcast News Production
 Building Maintenance
 Cabinetmaking
 Carpentry
 CNC Milling Specialist
 CNC Technician
 CNC Turning Specialist
 Collision Repair Technology
 Commercial Baking
 Computer Programming
 Cosmetology
 Crime Scene Investigation
 Criminal Justice
 Culinary Arts
 Dental Assisting
 Diesel Equipment Technology
 Digital Cinema Production
 Early Childhood Education
 Electrical Construction Wiring
 Electronics Technology
 Esthetics
 Firefighting
 Graphic Communications
 Graphics Imaging – Sublimation
 Heating, Ventilation, Air Conditioning and Refrigeration
 Industrial Motor Control
 Information Technology Services
 Interactive Application and Video Game Design
 Internet of Things (IIOT) Smart Home
 Internetworking
 Marine Service Technology
 Masonry
 Mechatronics
 Medical Assisting
 Mobile Electronics Installation
 Mobile Robotics Technology
 Motorcycle Service Technology
 Nail Care
 Nurse Assisting
 Photography
 Plumbing
 Power Equipment Technology
 Practical Nursing
 Residential Commercial and Appliance Technology
 Restaurant Service
 Robotics and Automation Technology
 Robotics: Urban Search and Rescue
 Screen Printing Technology
 Sheet Metal
 Team Engineering Challenge
 TeamWorks
 Technical Computer Applications
 Technical Drafting
 Telecommunications Cabling
 Television (Video) Production
 Web Design and Development
 Welding
 Welding Fabrication
 Welding Sculpture

Leadership Development 

 Action Skills
 American Spirit
 Chapter Business Procedure
 Chapter Display
 Community Action Project
 Community Service
 Employment Application Process
 Extemporaneous Speaking
 Job Interview
 Job Skill Demonstration A
 Job Skill Demonstration Open
 Occupational Health and Safety
 Opening and Closing Ceremonies
 Outstanding Chapter
 Pin Design (State Conference)
 Prepared Speech
 Promotional Bulletin Board
 Quiz Bowl
 Spelling
 T-shirt Design

Occupational Skills
Career Pathway Showcase (Agriculture/Food; Business Management and Technology; Health Services; Human Services; Industrial and Engineering Technology)
Customer Service
Engineering Technology
Entrepreneurship
First Aid/CPR
Health Knowledge Bowl
Health Occupations Professional Portfolio
Medical Math
Medical Terminology
Principles of Engineering Technology
Related Technical Math

References

External links
Official SkillsUSA website

Career and technical student organizations